The 1996 LSU Tigers baseball team won the NCAA national championship in one of the most memorable College World Series games in history.

The Tigers, coached by Skip Bertman, had already established themselves as a premier college baseball program, having won two previous national championships in 1991 and 1993.  The 1996 version built on this reputation by compiling a 52–15 record, including going 20–10 in the Southeastern Conference, winning the SEC championship as well.

Regular season
The Tigers regular season record was 43–13 with notable losses coming against conference rivals Alabama and a 3-game sweep at the hands of Florida.

SEC tournament
LSU defeated Tennessee in the first game of the 1996 SEC baseball tournament but then lost to Florida (their fourth loss to them in as many games) and Kentucky and were eliminated.

NCAA Tournament Regional
LSU cruised through the regional round (hosted by LSU at Alex Box Stadium) of the NCAA Tournament defeating Austin Peay 9-3, UNLV 7-6, UNO 17–4 and Georgia Tech 29-13.

College World Series
The Tigers opened the College World Series by defeating Wichita State 9-8, the same team they beat in the championship games of 1991 and 1993.  LSU then moved on to play conference rival Florida (who had beaten the Tigers in all four games played earlier in the season).  LSU won 9-4.  Florida then came back through the losers bracket to face LSU again.  The Tigers won the second game 2–1 to move onto the championship game.

The championship game featured a match-up of two college baseball powers in LSU and Miami (Florida).  Both teams had previously won 2 national championships (Miami: 1982 & 1985) and were vying for their third.  Miami featured future major leaguers Alex Cora and Pat Burrell, who helped the Hurricanes to establish a 7–3 lead in the game.  However, the Tigers would fight back to tie the game.  Cora then reclaimed the lead for Miami with an RBIs single and the Hurricanes then led 8–7 heading into the 9th inning.

With 2 outs and a runner on third base LSU only needed a base hit or a wild pitch to tie the game.  An unlikely hero emerged from the LSU dugout in Warren Morris, who had been hurt most of the year.  He stepped to the plate and faced pitcher Robbie Morrison.  Morris swung on Morrison's first pitch and lined the ball just inches over the right field fence for a 2 out, game winning walk off home run. This was his first home run of the season.

Aftermath
Morris' home run would later win the 1997 Showstopper of the Year ESPY Award.

The Tigers won their third national championship and would follow it up with three more in 1997, 2000 and 2009.  Miami would recover and go on to win two more national championships as well in 1999 and 2001.

Schedule/Results

Roster

Coaches

Players

References

External links
USAToday.com: LSU dramatics trigger memory

Lsu
LSU Tigers baseball seasons
NCAA Division I Baseball Championship seasons
College World Series seasons
Southeastern Conference baseball champion seasons
LSU
LSU